Alterman is a surname of German and also Yiddish origin, meaning "old man". Notable people of the surname include the following:

 Boris Alterman (born 1970), Israeli chess player of Ukrainian origin
 Dan Alterman (born 1980), Israeli triathlete
 Eric Alterman (born 1960), American columnist
 Idan Alterman (born 1971), Israeli actor
 Ira Alterman (1945–2015), American journalist and author
 Kent Alterman, American film director and producer
 Meyer Alterman (1891–1967), New York assemblyman
 Nathan Alterman (1910–1970), Israeli writer of Polish origin
 Ran Alterman (born 1980), Israeli triathlete

See also 
 Eva Alterman Blay (born 1937), Brazilian sociologist and politician
 Altermann

References 

German-language surnames
Ashkenazi surnames

pt:Altermann#Alterman
Yiddish-language surnames